The Anglican Diocese of Ogori-Magongo is one of eleven within the Anglican Province of Lokoja, itself one of 14 provinces within the Church of Nigeria.

On 11 January 2009, The Rt Revd Festus Davies was consecrated by the Church of Nigeria at the All Saints Cathedral Church, Ughelli.

Notes

Church of Nigeria dioceses
Dioceses of the Province of Lokoja